Bontje is a surname. Notable people with the surname include:

Rob Bontje (born 1981), Dutch volleyball player 
Ellen Bontje (born 1958), Dutch olympic equestrian